The Scout and Guide movement in Suriname is served by

 Surinaamse Padvindsters Raad, member of the World Association of Girl Guides and Girl Scouts
 Boy Scouts van Suriname, member of the World Organization of the Scout Movement
 Gidsen Suriname, the Catholic Guide and Scouts organisation.

References